Luzon is the largest and most populous island in the Philippines. Located in the northern portion of the Philippines archipelago, it is the economic and political center of the nation, being home to the country's capital city, Manila, as well as Quezon City, the country's most populous city. With a population of 64 million , it contains 52.5% of the country's total population and is the fourth most populous island in the world. It is the 15th largest island in the world by land area.

Luzon may also refer to one of the three primary island groups in the country. In this usage, it includes the Luzon mainland, the Batanes and Babuyan groups of islands to the north, Polillo Islands to the east, and the outlying islands of Catanduanes, Marinduque and Mindoro, among others, to the south. The islands of Masbate, Palawan and Romblon are also included, although these three are sometimes grouped with another of the island groups, the Visayas.

Etymology

The name Luzon is thought to derive from lusong, a Tagalog word referring to a particular kind of large wooden mortar used in dehusking rice. A 2008 research paper by Eulito Bautista and Evelyn Javier provides an image of a lusong, explaining:

In old Latin, Italian, and Portuguese maps, the island is often called "Luçonia" or "Luconia."

Luções,  (also Luzones in Spanish) was a demonym used by Portuguese sailors in Malaysia during the early 1500s, referring to the Kapampangan and Tagalog people who lived in Manila Bay, which was then called Lusong, from which Luzon was also derived. The term was also used for Tagalog settlers in Southern Tagalog region. Eventually, the term "Luzones" would refer to the settlers of Luzon island, and later on, would be exclusive to the peoples of Central Luzon.

History

Before European colonization 
Luzon was originally inhabited by Negritos before Austronesians from Taiwan arrived and displaced them. Some of the Austronesian peoples formed highland mountain civilizations, while others formed lowland coastal states. Among the coastal states, some were Hindu-Buddhist kingdoms, some were Muslim principalities, and others were ethnoreligious tribes. These states had trading connections with India, Borneo, Java, Sumatra, Malaya, Indochina, Bengal, Korea, Okinawa, Japan and China.

Before 1000 CE, the Tagalog, Kapampangan, and Pangasinan peoples of south and central Luzon had established several major coastal polities, notably Maynila, Tondo and Namayan. The oldest known Philippine document, written in 900, is the Laguna Copperplate Inscription, which names places in and around Manila Bay and also mentions Medan, a place in Indonesia. These coastal Philippine kingdoms were thalassocracies, based on trade with neighboring Asian political entities, and structured by leases between village rulers (Datu) and landlords (Lakan) or Rajahs, by whom tributes were extracted and taxes were levied.

There was also a Buddhist polity known as Ma-i or Maidh, described in Chinese and Bruneian records in the 10th century AD, although its location is still unknown and scholars are divided on whether it is in modern-day Bay, Laguna or Bulalacao, Mindoro.

According to sources at the time, the trade in large native Ruson-tsukuri (literally Luzon-made, Japanese:呂宋製) clay jars used for storing green tea and rice wine with Japan flourished in the 12th century, and local Tagalog, Kapampangan and Pangasinan potters had marked each jar with Baybayin letters denoting the particular urn used and the kiln the jars were manufactured in. Certain kilns were renowned over others; prices depended on the reputation of the kiln. Of this flourishing trade, the Burnay jars of Ilocos are the only large clay jar manufactured in Luzon today with origins from this time.

In the early 1300s the Chinese annals, Nanhai zhi, reported that Hindu Brunei invaded or administered Sarawak and Sabah as well as the Philippine kingdoms of Butuan, Sulu, and in Luzon: Ma-i (Mindoro) and Malilu 麻裏蘆 (present-day Manila; Shahuchong 沙胡重 (present-day Siocon or Zamboanga), Yachen 啞陳 Oton (Part of the Madja-as Kedatuan), and 文杜陵 Wenduling (present-day Mindanao), which would regain their independence at a later date.

During the 1360s, the Javanese-centered Hindu-Buddhist Shivaite empire of Majapahit briefly ruled over Luzon as recorded in the epic poem Nagarakretagama, which reports imperial colonies in the Philippines at Saludong (Manila) and Solot (Sulu). Eventually, the kingdoms of Luzon regained independence from Majapahit after the 1365 Battle of Manila. Sulu also reestablished independence and in vengeance assaulted the Majapahit province of Poni (Brunei) before a fleet from the capital drove them out.

In 1405, the Yongle Emperor appointed a Chinese governor of Luzon, Ko Ch'a-lao, during Zheng He's voyages. China also had vassals among the leaders in the archipelago. China attained ascendancy in trade with the area in Yongle's reign.

Afterwards, some parts of Luzon were Islamized when the former Majapahit province of Poni broke free, converted to Islam, and imported Sharif Ali, a prince from Mecca who became the Sultan of Brunei, a nation that then expanded its realms from Borneo to the Philippines and set up the Kingdom of Maynila as its puppet-state. However, other Luzon kingdoms resisted Islam, like the Wangdom of Pangasinan. It had remained a tributary state of China and was a largely Sinified kingdom, which maintained trade with Japan.

Interactions with the Portuguese 
The Portuguese were the first European explorers who recorded it in their charts as Luçonia or Luçon and inhabitants were called Luções. Edmund Roberts, who visited Luzon in the early 19th century, wrote that Luzon was "discovered" in 1521.

Many people from Luzon were employed within Portuguese Malacca. For example, the spice magnate Regimo de Raja, based in Malacca, was highly influential and was appointed as Temenggong (Sea Lord)—a governor and chief general responsible for overseeing of maritime trade—by the Portuguese. As Temenggong, de Raja was also the head of an armada which traded and protected commerce between the Indian Ocean, the Strait of Malacca, the South China Sea, and the medieval maritime principalities of the Philippines. His father and wife carried on his maritime trading business after his death. Another important Malacca trader was Curia de Raja who also hailed from Luzon. The "surname" of "de Raja" or "diraja" could indicate that Regimo and Curia, and their families, were of noble or royal descent as the term is an abbreviation of Sanskrit adiraja.

Fernão Mendes Pinto noted that a number of Luções in the Islamic fleets went to battle with the Portuguese in the Philippines during the 16th century. The Sultan of Aceh gave one of them (Sapetu Diraja) the task of holding Aru (northeast Sumatra) in 1540. Pinto also says one was named leader of the Malays remaining in the Moluccas Islands after the Portuguese conquest in 1511. Antonio Pigafetta notes that one of them was in command of the Brunei fleet in 1521. However, the Luções did not only fight on the side of the Muslims. Pinto says they were also apparently among the natives of the Philippines who fought the Muslims in 1538.

On Mainland Southeast Asia, Lusung/Luções warriors aided the Burmese king in his invasion of Siam in 1547 AD. At the same time, Lusong warriors fought alongside the Siamese king and faced the same elephant army of the Burmese king in the defence of the Siamese capital at Ayutthaya. Luções military and trade activity reached as far as Sri Lanka in South Asia where Lungshanoid pottery made in Luzon were discovered in burials.

Scholars have thus suggested that they could be mercenaries valued by all sides.

Spanish Colonial Era 
The Spanish arrival in the 16th century saw the incorporation of the Luções people and the breaking up of their kingdoms and the establishment of the Las Islas Filipinas with its capital Cebu, which was moved to Manila following the defeat of the local Rajah Sulayman in 1570. Under Spain, Luzon also came to be known as the Nueva Castilla or the New Castile.

In Spanish times, Luzon became the focal point for trade between the Americas and Asia. The Manila Galleons constructed in the Bicol region brought silver mined from Peru and Mexico to Manila. The silver was used to purchase Asian commercial goods like Chinese silk, Indian gems and Indonesian spices, which were then exported back to the Americas. The Chinese valued Luzon so much, in that when talking about Spain and the Spanish-Americas, they preferred to call it as "Dao Lusong” (Greater Luzon) while the original Luzon was referred to as “Xiao (Small) Lusong” to refer to not only Luzon but the whole Philippines.

Luzon also became a focal point for global migration. The walled city of Intramuros was initially founded by 1200 Spanish families. The nearby district of Binondo became the center of business and transformed into the world's oldest Chinatown. There was also a smaller district reserved for Japanese migrants in Dilao. Cavite City also served as the main port for Luzon and many Mexican soldiers and sailors were stationed in the naval garrisons there. When the Spanish evacuated from Ternate, Indonesia; they settled the Papuan refugees in Ternate, Cavite which was named after their evacuated homeland. After the short British Occupation of Manila, the Indian Sepoy soldiers that mutinied against their British commanders and joined the Spanish, then settled in Cainta, Rizal.

Newcomers who were impoverished Mexicans and peninsulares were accused of undermining the submission of the natives. In 1774, authorities from Bulacan, Tondo, Laguna Bay, and other areas surrounding Manila reported with consternation that discharged soldiers and deserters (from Mexico, Spain and Peru) were providing Indios military training for the weapons that had been disseminated all over the territory during the British war. There was also continuous immigration of Tamils and Bengalis into the rural areas of Luzon: Spanish administrators, native nobles, and Chinese businessmen imported them as slave labor during this period.

People from the Philippines, primarily from Luzon, were recruited by France (then in alliance with Spain), first to defend Indo-Chinese converts to Christianity being persecuted by their native governments. Eventually, Filipino mercenaries helped the French conquer Vietnam and Laos and to re-establish Cambodia as a French Protectorate. This process culminated in the establishment of French Cochinchina, centered in Saigon.

After Spanish colonization 
After many years of Spanish occupation and resistance to reform, the Andres Novales uprising occurred and it was inspired by the Latin American Wars of Independence. Novales' uprising was primarily supported by Mexicans living in the Philippines as well as immigrant Latinos from the now independent nations of Colombia, Venezuela, Peru, Chile, Argentina and Costa Rica. Although the uprising failed it inspired the Cavite Mutiny, the suppression of which, lead to the martyrdoms of Priests, Gomburza and the subsequent execution of the reformist and hero, Jose Rizal. Reeling against this, the Philippine Revolution against Spain erupted in Cavite and spread all throughout Luzon and the Philippines. Consequently, the First Philippine Republic was established in Malolos, Bulacan. In the meantime, Spain sold the Philippines to the United States and the First Philippine Republic resisted the United States in the Philippine–American War which the Republic's forces lost due to its diplomatic isolation (no foreign nation recognized the First Republic) as well as due to the numerical superiority of the American military. The Americans then set up the cool mountain city of Baguio as a summer retreat for its officials. The Americans also rebuilt the capital, Manila, and established American military bases in Olongapo and Angeles City.

During the Pacific War, the Philippines were considered to be of great strategic importance because their capture by Japan would pose a significant threat to the U.S. As a result, 135,000 troops and 227 aircraft were stationed in the Philippines by October 1941. Luzon was captured by Imperial Japanese forces in 1942 during their campaign to capture the Philippines. General Douglas MacArthur—who was in charge of the defense of the Philippines at the time—was ordered to Australia, and the remaining U.S. forces retreated to the Bataan Peninsula.

A few months after this, MacArthur expressed his belief that an attempt to recapture the Philippines was necessary. The U.S. Pacific Commander Admiral Chester Nimitz and Chief of Naval Operations Admiral Ernest King both opposed this idea, arguing that it must wait until victory was certain. MacArthur had to wait two years for his wish; it was 1944 before a campaign to recapture the Philippines was launched. The island of Leyte was the first objective of the campaign, which was captured by the end of December 1944. This was followed by the attack on Mindoro and later, Luzon.

The end of the World War necessitated decolonization due to rising nationalist movements across the world's many colonies. Subsequently, the Philippines gained independence from the United States. Luzon then arose to become the most developed island in the Philippines. However, the lingering poverty and inequality caused by the long dictatorship of US-supported dictator, Ferdinand Marcos, gave rise to the Philippine diaspora and many people from Luzon have migrated elsewhere and had established large overseas communities; mainly in the United States, Hong Kong, Singapore and Saudi Arabia. Eventually, the People Power Revolution led by Corazon Aquino and Cardinal Jaime Sin, removed Marcos and his cronies from power and they fled to Hawaii where the US granted them asylum. The following administrations are subsequently managing the political and economic recovery of the Philippines with the particular aim of spreading development outside of Luzon and into the more isolated provinces of the Visayas and Mindanao.

Geography

It is bordered on the west by the South China Sea (Luzon Sea in Philippine territorial waters), on the east by the Philippine Sea, and on the north by the Luzon Strait containing the Babuyan Channel and Balintang Channel. The mainland is roughly rectangular in shape and has the long Bicol Peninsula protruding to the southeast.

Luzon is roughly divided into four sections; Northern Luzon, Central and Southern Luzon, and the National Capital Region.

Physical

Northern Luzon 
The northwestern portion of the island, which encompasses most of the Ilocos Region, is characterized by a flat terrain extending east from the coastline toward the Cordillera Central mountains.

The Cordillera mountain range, which feature the island's north-central section, is covered in a mixture of tropical pine forests and montane rainforests, and is the site of the island's highest mountain, Mount Pulag, rising at 2,922 metres. The range provides the upland headwaters of the Agno River, which stretches from the slopes of Mount Data, and meanders along the southern Cordillera mountains before reaching the plains of Pangasinan.

The northeastern section of Luzon is generally mountainous, with the Sierra Madre, the longest mountain range in the country, abruptly rising a few miles from the coastline. Located in between the Sierra Madre and the Cordillera Central mountain ranges is the large Cagayan Valley. This region, which is known for being the second largest producer of rice and the country's top corn-producer, serves as the basin for the Cagayan River, the longest in the Philippines.

Along the southern limits of the Cordillera Central lies the lesser-known Caraballo Mountains. These mountains form a link between the Cordillera Central and the Sierra Madre mountain ranges, separating the Cagayan Valley from the Central Luzon plains.

Image gallery

Central Luzon 

The central section of Luzon is characterized by a flat terrain, known as the Central Luzon plain, the largest in the island in terms of land area. In the middle of the plain rises the solitary Mount Arayat.

The western coasts of Central Luzon are typically flat extending east from the coastline to the Zambales Mountains, the site of Mount Pinatubo, made famous because of its enormous 1991 eruption. These mountains extend to the sea in the north, forming Lingayen Gulf, and to the south, forming the Bataan Peninsula. The peninsula encloses Manila Bay, a natural harbor considered to be one of the best natural ports in East Asia, due to its size and strategic geographical location.

The Sierra Madre mountain range continues to stretch across the western section of Central Luzon, snaking southwards into the Bicol Peninsula.

Southern Luzon 

The northern section of Southern Luzon is dominated by Laguna de Bay (Old Spanish, "Lake of Bay town"), the largest lake in the country. The  lake is drained into Manila Bay by the Pasig River, one of the most important rivers in the country due to its historical significance and because it runs through the center of Metro Manila.

The environs of the lake form the upland Tagaytay Ridge, which was once part of a massive prehistoric volcano that covered the southern portion of the province of Cavite, Tagaytay and the whole of Batangas province.

South of Laguna Lake are two solitary mountains, Mount Makiling in Laguna province, and Mount Banahaw, the highest in the region of Calabarzon.

The Sierra Madre range has its southern limits at Quezon province. Ultra-prominent mountains dot the landscape, which include Mount Isarog and Mount Iriga in Camarines Sur, and Mount Bulusan in Sorsogon.

The peninsula's coastline features several smaller peninsulas, gulfs and bays, which include Lamon Bay, San Miguel Bay, Lagonoy Gulf, Ragay Gulf, and Sorsogon Bay.

Outlying islands 
Several outlying islands near mainland Luzon are considered part of the Luzon island group.
The largest include Palawan, Mindoro, Masbate, Catanduanes, Marinduque, Romblon and Polillo.

Administrative divisions
The island is covered by 8 administrative regions, 30 provinces and, 68 cities (8 regions, 38 provinces and 71 cities if associated islands are included).

Table note(s):

Tectonics

Luzon is part of the Philippine Mobile Belt, a fast deforming plate boundary zone (Gervasio, 1967) hemmed in between two opposing subduction zones, the west-dipping Philippine Trench-East Luzon Trench subduction zone, and the east-dipping north–south trending Manila Trench-Negros Trench-Cotabato Trench. The Philippine Sea Plate subducts under eastern Luzon along the East Luzon Trench and the Philippine Trench, while the South China Sea basin, part of the Eurasian plate, subducts under western Luzon along the Manila Trench.

The North-Southeastern trending braided left-lateral strike-slip Philippine Fault System traverses Luzon, from Quezon province and Bicol to the northwestern part of the island. This fault system takes up part of the motion due to the subducting plates and produces large earthquakes. Southwest of Luzon is a collision zone where the Palawan micro-block collides with SW Luzon, producing a highly seismic zone near Mindoro island. Southwest Luzon is characterized by a highly volcanic zone, called the Macolod Corridor, a region of crustal thinning and spreading.

Using geologic and structural data, seven principal blocks were identified in Luzon in 1989: the Sierra Madre Oriental, Angat, Zambales, Central Cordillera of Luzon, Bicol, and Catanduanes Island blocks. Using seismic and geodetic data, Luzon was modeled by Galgana et al. (2007) as a series of six micro blocks or micro plates (separated by subduction zones and intra-arc faults), all translating and rotating in different directions, with maximum velocities ~100 mm/yr NW with respect to Sundaland/Eurasia.

Demographics

As of the 2015 census, the population of Luzon Island is 53,336,134 people, making it the 4th most populated island in the world.

Cities

Metro Manila is the most populous of the 3 defined metropolitan areas in the Philippines and the 11th most populous in the world. , census data showed it had a population of 11,553,427, comprising 13% of the national population. Including suburbs in the adjacent provinces (Bulacan, Cavite, Laguna, and Rizal) of Greater Manila, the population is around 21 million.

Ethnic groups

Seven major Philippine ethnolinguistic groups predominate Luzon. Ilocanos dominate northern Luzon, while Kapampangans and Pangasinenses, as well as Tagalogs and Sambals, populate Central Luzon. Tagalogs dominate the National Capital Region, Calabarzon and the island provinces of Marinduque and Mindoro, while Bicolanos populate the southern Bicol peninsula. Visayans mainly predominate in the island provinces of Masbate, Palawan and Romblon.

Other ethnic groups lesser in population include the Aetas of Zambales and Bataan, the Ibanags of Cagayan and Isabela, along with smaller groups like the Gaddang of Nueva Vizcaya, and the Igorot/Cordillerans of the Cordilleras.

Due to recent migrations, populations of Chinese and Moros have also been present in urban areas. Mixed-race populations of Spanish, Americans, Japanese, Koreans, Indians (mostly Punjabis), and Arabs are also visible. The Chinese and their mixed-raced descendants are spread all across Luzon. According to old Spanish censuses, around 1/3rd of the population of Luzon are admixed with either Spanish or Latino descent (Mostly in Cavite and Manila) Most Americans have settled in Central Luzon's highly urbanized cities of Angeles and Olongapo due to the former presence of the U.S. air and naval bases in there, while a majority of the Koreans and Japanese have mainly settled in the major cities and towns.

Languages

Almost all of the languages of Luzon belong to the Philippine group of the Malayo-Polynesian branch of the Austronesian language family. Major regional languages include: Tagalog, Ilocano, Bicolano, Kapampangan, and Pangasinan.

English is spoken by many inhabitants. The use of Spanish as an official language declined following the American occupation of the Philippines. Almost inexistent among the general populace, Spanish is still used by the elderly of some families of great tradition (Rizal, Liboro...).

Religion

Like most of the Philippines, the major religion in Luzon is Christianity, with Roman Catholicism being the major denomination. Other major sects includes Jehovah's Witnesses, Protestantism, the Philippine Independent Church (Aglipayans), the Church of Jesus Christ of Latter-day Saints (Mormons), and the Iglesia ni Cristo. Indigenous traditions and rituals, though rare, are also present.

There are also sizable communities of Hindus, Buddhists and Muslims in Metro Manila and in other, especially, urban areas due to the immigration of Moros and Chinese to the island.

Economy
The economy of the island is centered in Metro Manila with Makati serving as the main economic and financial hub. Major companies such as Ayala, Jollibee Foods Corporation, SM Group, and Metrobank are based in the business districts of Makati, Ortigas Center, and Bonifacio Global City. Industry is concentrated in and around the urban areas of Metro Manila while agriculture predominates in the other regions of the island producing crops such as rice, bananas, mangoes, coconuts, pineapple, and coffee. Other sectors include livestock raising, tourism, mining, and fishing.

See also

 Regions of the Philippines
 Provinces of the Philippines
 Battle of Luzon
 Visayas
 Mindanao

Notes

References

Further reading

External links

 
 
 
 
 

 
Island groups of the Philippines
Islands of the Philippines
Islands of Luzon